CubicWeb is a free and open-source semantic web application framework, licensed under the LGPL. It is written in Python.

It has been an open free software project since October 2008, but the project began in 2000 and was initially developed by Logilab for internal uses such as intranet, bug tracker and forge applications.

As of 2012, CubicWeb is being used in large-scale semantic web and linked open data applications and international corporations.

Concepts 

The framework is entirely driven by a data model. Once the data model is defined, one gets a functional web application and can further customize the views (by default it provides a set of default views for each type of data).

A cube is a reusable component defining specific features. For example, a cube forge allows one to create one's own forge and the forge cube reuses the cubes comment, file, email, etc. Interesting general purpose cubes include dbpedia and openlibrary.

The framework has been translated to English, French, Spanish and German (April 2011).

Functions 
 Semantic web: supports OWL/RDF
 Multi-source: supports RQL, SQL, LDAP, Subversion and Mercurial
 RQL: Relationship query language to ease data querying
 Migration tool: fits into agile development
 View selection principle: the engine selects the best view to fit the content to display according to the context
 Cubes library: a wide range of cubes are available on the forge

See also

 Jena
 Mulgara
 RDFLib
 Sesame

References

Further reading

External links

CubicWeb project forge
CubicWeb blog
OSCON 2010 presentation of CubicWeb
French Semantic Web Conference
CubicWeb components in the Python Package Index (PyPI)
paper at Extended Semantic Web Conference 2013

Semantic Web
Python (programming language) web frameworks
Free software programmed in Python
Software using the LGPL license